Dar-e Bala (also Romanized as Dar-e Bālā and Darbālā) is a village in Pishva Rural District, in the Central District of Pishva County, Tehran Province, Iran. At the 2006 census, its population was 544, in 116 families.

References 

Populated places in Pishva County